The Journal of Applied Statistics or J.Appl.Stat. is a peer-reviewed scientific journal covering applied statistics that is published by Taylor & Francis. Its Journal Citation Reports impact factor was 1.013 in 2019.

Creation
The journal was founded by Gopal Kanji in 1974 as the Bulletin in Applied Statistics (BIAS). Kanji remained as editor until the end of 2007.

Quality rankings
In 2020, the Australian Mathematical Society listed J.Appl.Stat. with a ranking of B on a scale including A*, A, B and C. J.Appl.Stat. states that its Journal Citation Reports impact factor was 0.699 in 2017 and 1.013 in 2019.

References

External links

Statistics journals